The Qarhan or Cha'erhan railway station is a station on the Qingzang Railway at Qarhan in Golmud County, Haixi Prefecture, Qinghai Province, China.

Qarhan station is located in Qarhan Playa of the Qaidam Basin, near Dabusun Lake where major salt works are located. As of 2012, a  private railway branch from this station to the nearby facilities of the Zangge Potash Co Ltd. is under construction.

Most passenger trains pass through Qarhan without stopping. As of 2017, just one train a day in each direction (local service XiningGolmud) stops there.

See also
 Qingzang Railway
 List of stations on Qingzang railway

References

Railway stations in Qinghai
Stations on the Qinghai–Tibet Railway